Ha Ha Tonka State Park is a public recreation area encompassing over  on the Niangua arm of the Lake of the Ozarks, about five miles south of Camdenton, Missouri, in the United States. The state park's most notable feature is the ruins of Ha Ha Tonka, an early 20th-century stone mansion that was modeled after European castles of the 16th century.

The park also features caves, sinkholes, and bluffs overlooking the lake. It is a prominent example of karst topography, which is geological formation shaped by the dissolution of a layer or layers of soluble bedrock. A  portion of the park was designated as the Ha Ha Tonka Karst Natural Area in 1981.

History

Construction of the Ha Ha Tonka castle was started in 1905 by Robert McClure Snyder Sr., a Kansas City businessman who purchased the large property after first visiting there in 1903. Alluding to the natural springs on the property, "ha ha tonka" was said to mean "big laugh" or "smiling waters."

Following Snyder's death in an auto accident in 1906, the castle was completed by his sons Robert Jr., LeRoy, and Kenneth Snyder in the early 1920s before the Stock Market Crash. The building was used as a summer and weekend home by the Snyder family, who lived in Kansas City. In the late 1930s, it was used as a hotel; however, it was destroyed by fire in 1942.

The state purchased the castle and grounds in 1978, adapting them for use as a state park and opening them to the public. The water tower was repaired in 2004, with a new roof installed. Although the castle walls were stabilized in the 1980s, a new survey in 2016 determined that portions of the ruins including its arches were seeing mortar and stone failure with the potential beginning of collapse. Some areas have been closed off from the public. The ruins can be seen from an observation point across from the park office.

Activities and amenities
The park has 15 miles of hiking trails leading to caves, sinkholes, natural bridges, and the castle. The park also features boating, fishing, and swimming.

Trails 
As of 2020, there are 14 trails at the park.

Gallery

References

External links

Ha Ha Tonka State Park Missouri Department of Natural Resources
Ha Ha Tonka State Park Map Missouri Department of Natural Resources

State parks of Missouri
Protected areas of Camden County, Missouri
Protected areas established in 1978
Lake of the Ozarks
1978 establishments in Missouri